Victor Josephus Godts (born 17 March 1893, date of death unknown) was a Belgian sailor. He and Albert Vos competed for Belgium at the 1936 Summer Olympics in the Star event.

References

External links
 
 

1893 births
Year of death missing
Belgian male sailors (sport)
Olympic sailors of Belgium
Sailors at the 1936 Summer Olympics – Star
Sportspeople from Antwerp